Blizzard of 2009 may refer to:

North American Blizzard of 2009
European winter storms of 2009–10
February 2009 Great Britain and Ireland snowfall
2009 North American Christmas blizzard